Scottish studies is an academic discipline. It is the study of the languages and literary and cultural heritage of Scotland.

See also
 Area studies

References